The Drone Papers is a leak of national security documents published by The Intercept in October 2015 on the United States's use of drone warfare. The leak revealed the bureaucratic process of approving a drone strike. In one five-month period, the primary sources showed that 90 percent of United States drone killings were "not the intended targets".

Response 

Micah Zenko of Foreign Policy wrote that the Drone Papers "mandate a Congressional investigation" but did not expect one to happen during the Obama administration.

References

External links 

 

News leaks
Whistleblowing in the United States
Investigative journalism
United States foreign policy
Drone warfare